Algophagidae is a family of mites in the  order Astigmata. There are about 5 genera and at least 10 described species in Algophagidae.

Genera
These five genera belong to the family Algophagidae:
 Algophagus Hughes, 1955
 Fusohericia Vitzthum, 1931
 Hericia Canestrini, 1888
 Neohyadesia Hughes & Goodman, 1969
 Terraphagus Clark, 2012

References

Further reading

 
 
 

Acari
Acari families